Bandeirante Esporte Clube, or simply Bandeirante, is a Brazilian football team based in Birigui, São Paulo. Founded in 1965, it plays in Campeonato Paulista Série A3.

History
The club was founded on March 11, 1923. They won the Campeonato Paulista Segunda Divisão in 1963, the Campeonato Paulista Série A2 in 1986 and the Copa Coca-Cola de Futebol in 2001.

Achievements

 Campeonato Paulista Série A2:
 Winners (1): 1986
 Campeonato Paulista Segunda Divisão:
 Winners (1): 1963
 Copa Paulista de Futebol:
 Winners (1): 2001

Stadium
Bandeirante Esporte Clube play their home games at Estádio Pedro Marin Berbel. The stadium has a maximum capacity of 10,012 people.

References

Association football clubs established in 1923
Association football clubs established in 1965
Football clubs in São Paulo (state)
1923 establishments in Brazil
1965 establishments in Brazil